The alpine thrush (Zoothera mollissima) is a species of bird in the thrush family.

Taxonomy and systematics
The alpine thrush was formerly known as the plain-backed thrush until split into the Sichuan thrush and the newly discovered Himalayan thrush.

Distribution and habitat
It is found from the north-western Himalayas to southern China. Its natural habitats are subtropical or tropical high-altitude shrubland and subtropical or tropical high-altitude grassland.

Gallery

References

External links
Details of alpine thrush

alpine thrush
Birds of the Himalayas
Birds of Tibet
Birds of Central China
alpine thrush
alpine thrush
Taxonomy articles created by Polbot